The 2022 WAFF Women's Futsal Championship was the third edition of the WAFF Women's Futsal Championship, an international women's futsal tournament organised by the West Asian Football Federation (WAFF). The tournament was held from 15 to 24 June 2022.

Participating nations
Six teams entered the WAFF Women's Futsal Championship final tournament.

Group stage

Group A

Group B

Placement matches

Fifth place match

Knockout stage

Semi-finals

Third place match

Final

Champion

Player awards
The following awards were given at the conclusion of the tournament:

Goalscorers

Final ranking

References

External links
 http://www.futsalplanet.com/news.aspx?id=804&pa=1

2022 in Asian football
2022 in Asian futsal
2022 in futsal
2022
2021–22 in Bahraini football
2021–22 in Iraqi football
2021–22 in Kuwaiti football
2021–22 in Omani football
2021–22 in Saudi Arabian football
2021–22 in Palestinian football
WAFF